St. Libory may refer to one of the following places in the United States:

 St. Libory, Illinois
 St. Libory, Nebraska